Pervomayskoye is a rural locality (a selo) and the administrative center of Pervomaysky Selsoviet of Yegoryevsky District, Altai Krai, Russia. The population was 836 as of 2014. There are 13 streets.

Geography 
Pervomayskoye is located 30 km east of Novoyegoryevskoye (the district's administrative centre) by road. Mirny is the nearest rural locality.

References 

Rural localities in Yegoryevsky District, Altai Krai